The Ibis GS-710 Magic, also called the GS-450, is a Colombian homebuilt aircraft that was designed and produced by Ibis Aircraft of Cali, developed from the Ibis GS-700 Magic. When it was available the aircraft was supplied as a complete ready-to-fly-aircraft or as a kit for amateur construction.

Production has been completed and as of 2011 the aircraft was no longer part of the company's product line.

Design and development

The aircraft features a strut-braced high-wing, a two-seats-in-side-by-side configuration enclosed cabin with doors, fixed tricycle landing gear with wheel pants and a single engine in tractor configuration.

The GS-710 Magic is made from sheet aluminium "all-metal" construction, with the wing tips and cowling made from composite material. Its  span wing employs a NACA 650-18m airfoil and mounts flaps. The wing employs conventional ailerons or, optionally, Junkers ailerons with leading edge slats and is supported by V-struts with jury struts. The main landing gear is sprung 7075-T6 aluminium, while the nose gear has lever suspension using rubber pucks and helical springs. The main wheels include hydraulic disc brakes.

The standard engine used is the  Rotax 912UL powerplant, driving a three-bladed Ivoprop propeller.

The aircraft's empty weight was reduced by 15% over the GS-700.

Specifications (GS-710 Magic)

References

External links

GS
2000s Colombian civil utility aircraft
2000s Colombian ultralight aircraft
Single-engined tractor aircraft
High-wing aircraft
Homebuilt aircraft